There's a Kind of Hush All Over the World is the fifth album released by MGM Records in the US and Canada for the band Herman's Hermits. It was released in March 1967. In the UK, There's a Kind of Hush All Over the World is the band's third album, released by EMI/Columbia in May 1967.

The album did not chart in the UK but in late April 1967 peaked at 13 on Billboard's Top LPs chart. The album was not released in true stereo until Bear Family Records issued a 2 CD "50th Anniversary Collection" in 2015.

Track listing
 "There's a Kind of Hush (All Over the World)" (Les Reed, Geoff Stephens) – 2:35
 "Saturday's Child" (David Gates) – 2:38
 "If You're Thinkin' What I'm Thinkin'" (Tommy Boyce, Bobby Hart) – 2:27
 "You Won't Be Leaving" (Tony Hazzard) – 2:22
 "Dandy" (Ray Davies) – 2:03
 "Jezebel" (Wayne Shanklin) – 3:23
 "No Milk Today" (Graham Gouldman) – 2:58
 "Little Miss Sorrow, Child of Tomorrow" (Bruce Woodley) – 2:34
 "Gaslight Street" (Keith Hopwood, Derek Leckenby) – 2:30
 "Rattler" (Woodley) – 3:15
 "East West" (Graham Gouldman) – 2:00

2001 Repertoire Rerelease

 "There's a Kind of Hush (All Over the World)"
 "East West"
 "You Won't Be Leaving"
 "Saturday's Child"
 "If You're Thinkin' What I'm Thinkin'"
 "No Milk Today"
 "Little Miss Sorrow, Child of Tomorrow"
 "Gaslight Street"
 "Rattler"
 "Dandy"
 "Jezebel"

Bonus Tracks
 "This Door Swings Both Ways" (Estelle Levitt, Don Thomas)
 "What Is Wrong, What Is Right" (Hopwood, Leckenby, Lisberg)
 "I Can Take or Leave Your Loving" (Rick Jones)
 "Marcel's" (Gouldman, Hopwood, Lisberg, Peter Noone)
 "(I Gotta) Dream On" (Gary Gordon)
 "Don't Try to Hurt Me" (Hopwood)
 "Biding My Time" (George Gershwin, Ira Gershwin)
 "The George and the Dragon" (Fred Karger, Sid Wayne, Ben Weisman)
 "Wild Love" (Karger, Wayne, Weisman)
 "Gotta Get Away" (Karger, Wayne, Weisman)
 "Make Me Happy" (Karger, Wayne, Weisman)

References

1967 albums
Herman's Hermits albums
Albums produced by Mickie Most
EMI Columbia Records albums
MGM Records albums
Repertoire Records albums